Melalgus confertus, known generally as the branch and twig borer or grape cane borer, is a species of horned powder-post beetle in the family Bostrichidae. It is found in North America.

References

Further reading

 
 
 
 

Bostrichidae
Articles created by Qbugbot
Beetles described in 1866